St. Leo Church or St. Leo's Catholic Church or variations may refer to:
 
St. Leo's Roman Catholic Church, Mimico, in Toronto, Ontario, Canada
Chapel of St Leo, Żurrieq, Malta

United States
Saint Leo the Great Parish, San Jose, California
St. Leo's Church (Baltimore, Maryland), listed on the National Register of Historic Places (NRHP)
St. Leo's Catholic Church (Lewistown, Montana), NRHP-listed
St. Leo Church (New York City)

See also
St. Leonard's Church (disambiguation)